Pamela O. Long (born 1943) is an independent American historian specializing in late medieval and Renaissance history and the history of science and technology.

In 2007, she was chosen as a Guggenheim Fellow and in 2014, she was made a MacArthur Fellow.

Long graduated from the University of Maryland, College Park, and from Catholic University of America.

Works
Engineering the Eternal City: Infrastructure, Topography, and the Culture of Knowledge in the Late Sixteenth-Century Rome, University of Chicago Press, 2018, 
Science and technology in medieval society, New York Academy of Sciences, 1985,  

Artisan/Practitioners and the Rise of the New Sciences, 1400-1600, Oregon State University Press, 2011, 
With David McGee and Alan M. Stahl, The Book of Michael of Rhodes: A Fifteenth-Century Maritime Manuscript, 3 vols. (Cambridge, Mass.: MIT Press, 2009).

References

External links
http://www.pamelaolong.com/

1943 births
Living people
University of Maryland, College Park alumni
Catholic University of America alumni
MacArthur Fellows
American historians of science
Historians of technology
American medievalists
Women medievalists
Leonardo da Vinci Medal recipients
20th-century American historians
20th-century American women writers
21st-century American historians
21st-century American women writers
American women historians